This is a list of Malaysian List A cricketers. List A cricket matches are those between international teams or the highest standard of domestic teams in which teams have one innings each limited to a certain number of overs, usually between 40 and 50, though other over limits have been used. This list is not limited to those who have played List A cricket for Malaysia and may include Malaysian players who played their List A cricket elsewhere. The list is in alphabetical order.

See also

Malaysia national cricket team
List of Malaysian first-class cricketers

References

List A